Simoneta Racheva (born 1 March 1961) is a Bulgarian luger. She competed in the women's singles event at the 1988 Winter Olympics.

References

External links
 

1961 births
Living people
Bulgarian female lugers
Olympic lugers of Bulgaria
Lugers at the 1988 Winter Olympics
Place of birth missing (living people)